Berlin Savignyplatz is a railway station on the Berlin Stadtbahn line in the Charlottenburg district of Berlin. It is the newest of the stations on the Stadtbahn. The island platform, which is covered by a gable roof supported by cast iron columns, and the open entrance hall have monument protection. It has two entrances, one from a pedestrian zone connecting from the park of Savigny Platz via the street of Else-Ury-Bogen and a second from Schlüterstraße.

History 

The station was built in 1895/1896 on typical arches of the Berlin Stadtbahn in the middle of the then new residential area around Savigny Platz (named after the jurist Friedrich Carl von Savigny) between the stations of Zoologischer Garten (Zoo) and Charlottenburg. The opening took place on 1 August 1896.

In 1934, the station’s two stairwells with their nameplates and the entrance rooms were modernised. At the same time the railway arches in this area were given a dark brick facade.

References

External links

Berlin S-Bahn stations
Buildings and structures in Charlottenburg-Wilmersdorf
Railway stations in Germany opened in 1896